Simon Löf (born May 29, 1996) is a Swedish professional ice hockey defenceman who currently plays for Hudiksvall of the Swedish Hockeyettan.

References

External links 

1991 births
Living people
Almtuna IS players
Brynäs IF players
Mora IK players
Södertälje SK players
Sparta Warriors players
HC Vita Hästen players
Swedish expatriate ice hockey players in Norway
Swedish expatriate sportspeople in Italy
Swedish ice hockey defencemen